Fugang is a railway station on the Taiwan Railways Administration West Coast line located in Yangmei District, Taoyuan City, Taiwan.

History
In 1955, it was renamed to Fugang. It underwent renovation in 1988 which modified its appearance.

The station is a commuter station and is only served by local trains with less than 12 carriages.

See also
 List of railway stations in Taiwan

References

1929 establishments in Taiwan
Railway stations in Taoyuan City
Railway stations opened in 1929
Railway stations served by Taiwan Railways Administration